Anton Tõnis Jürgenstein (1 November 1861 Vana-Vändra Parish (now Põhja-Pärnumaa Parish), Kreis Pernau – 21 February 1933 Tartu) was an Estonian politician. He was a member of parliament (I Riigikogu).

References

1861 births
1933 deaths
People from Põhja-Pärnumaa Parish
People from Kreis Pernau
Russian Constitutional Democratic Party members
Estonian People's Party politicians
Members of the 2nd State Duma of the Russian Empire
Members of the Riigikogu, 1920–1923
Members of the Riigikogu, 1923–1926